Paula Karina Masotta Biagetti (born March 5, 1971 in Buenos Aires) is a retired field hockey player from Argentina, who won the silver medal with the national field hockey team at the 2000 Summer Olympics. She also won the Champions Trophy in 2001, the 2002 World Cup, the Pan American Cup in 2001 and three Pan American Games.

References

External links
 

1971 births
Argentine people of Italian descent
Living people
Argentine female field hockey players
Las Leonas players
Olympic field hockey players of Argentina
Field hockey players at the 1996 Summer Olympics
Field hockey players at the 2000 Summer Olympics
Olympic silver medalists for Argentina
Field hockey players from Buenos Aires
Olympic medalists in field hockey
Medalists at the 2000 Summer Olympics
Pan American Games gold medalists for Argentina
Pan American Games medalists in field hockey
Field hockey players at the 1991 Pan American Games
Field hockey players at the 1995 Pan American Games
Field hockey players at the 1999 Pan American Games
Medalists at the 1995 Pan American Games
Medalists at the 1991 Pan American Games
Medalists at the 1999 Pan American Games